Relief is the debut studio album by American rapper Mike Stud,  released on May 13, 2013. Relief chronicles Stud’s journey from his years as an All American pitcher at Duke, to his side-lining and ultimate career-ending injury, and his rise as a rapper.

Release and promotion

Singles 
Prior to the album's release, Stud posted videos for three of the album's tracks on his YouTube page. The first -- "Perfect For Me"—was released on February 11, 2013. This video was followed by an official video for "F**k That" on March 27 and "Past Gone" on April 8, of the same year.

Commercial performance
The album debuted at number 109 on the Billboard 200 chart, with first-week sales of 4,200 copies in the United States. In its second week the album sold 7,600 more copies bringing its total sales to 12,000.

Track listing

Charts

References 

Hip hop albums by American artists
2013 debut albums